Rectala is a genus of moths in the family Sesiidae.

Species
Rectala asyliformis Bryk, 1947
Rectala magnifica Kallies & Arita, 2001

References

Sesiidae